TaeguTec Ltd. (Korean: 대구텍), formerly known as Korea Tungsten Company, is a multinational corporation headquartered in Daegu, Korea. It is the largest cutting tools manufacturer in the Far East, also Korea's largest manufacturer of tungsten cutting tools and hard metal tools with the only integrated tungsten production plant in the world. TaeguTec group has 26 overseas subsidiaries and over 130 distributors and 30 agents in 50 countries across Europe, Asia, Australia, and the American countries. Considered as the world's oldest manufacturer of tungsten and related products, the group has earned reputation for its excellent global marketing and large production capacity worldwide. In addition to the initial 80 per cent stake purchased in 2006, Warren Buffett paid additional 2 billion dollars for the remaining stake in IMC, of which TaeguTec was a part. Through this acquisition, TaeguTec became Berkshire Hathaway's first and only wholly owned subsidiary in Korea. On October 25, 2007, Warren Buffett flew to Daegu to tour TaeguTec and to meet with the management. On March 21, 2011, Warren Buffett re-visited the firm to attend TaeguTec Plant 2 inauguration ceremony and later met with Korean President Lee Myung-bak.

History

Before 1960s
Apr. 1916: Outcrop of Sang-dong mine discovered in Gangwon Province, South Korea
Feb. 1947: Exported Scheelite to the U.S. for the first time
Sep. 1952: Korea Tungsten Company (KTC) established by the Korean government
Export: US$16,457,000 (56% of Korean total)
Employee: 4,287
May. 1959: Constructed chemical processing plant

1960s
Jun. 1961: Established New York office
Sep. 1961: Established R&D Center
Nov. 1961: Established London office
Feb. 1963: Established Tokyo office
Nov. 1966: Won official commendation from government for export
Ranked second among Korean companies
Nov. 1967: Won official commendation from government for export
Ranked third among Korean companies
Feb. 1968: POSCO established as a joint venture between the Korean government and KTC (government 75%; KTC 25%)
Nov. 1968: Won official commendation from government for export
Nov. 1969: Won official commendation from government for export

1970s
Nov. 1972: Constructed APT (Ammonium Para Tungstate) plant
Feb. 1974: Constructed tungsten metal powder and tungsten carbide powder plant
Nov. 1976: Established Rotterdam office
Nov. 1977: Constructed cemented carbide plant
Products: Blank, carbide insert, mining tools, brazed tools
Oct. 1978: Constructed coating plant (CVD-TiN production)
Dec. 1979: Constructed tool holder plant

1980s
Jan. 1981: Developed special coating substrate
May 1983: Rotterdam office in Netherlands moved to Germany
Jul. 1985: Common R&D cooperation between Korea Tungsten and POSCO
Oct. 1985: Developed CERMET inserts
Nov. 1988: Constructed carbide roll plant
Nov. 1989: Constructed tungsten wire plant

1990s
Mar. 1991: Constructed ceramic plant
Feb. 1994: Sang-dong tungsten mine closed
Mar. 1994: Privatized and taken over by Keopyung Group
May. 1995: Established tungsten wire plant in China
Aug. 1998: KTC bought out by Iscar
Aug. 1998: Company name changed from Korea Tungsten Company to TaeguTec Ltd.
Feb. 1999: Headquarters moved from Seoul to Taegu
Apr. 1999: Constructed new Marketing Center
1999: Established TaeguTec USA (currently Ingersoll USA)
1999: Established TaeguTec Germany (currently Ingersoll GmbH)

2000s
Mar. 2000: Established TaeguTec India in Bangalore 
Mar. 2000: Established TaeguTec UK in Leeds
Jul. 2000: Constructed new R&D Center
Dec. 2000: Established TaeguTec China in Shanghai
Mar. 2001: Established TaeguTec Brazil in Sao Paulo
Jun. 2001: Established TaeguTec Scandinavia in Copenhagen, Denmark
Jun. 2002: Established TaeguTec Italy in Turin & Milan
Jun. 2004: Established TaeguTec Japan in Nagoya
Jun. 2004: Constructed new Tech Center and Carbide Rod factory
Jun. 2005: Established TaeguTec Australia in Sydney
Oct. 2005: Established TaeguTec Turkey in Istanbul
Mar. 2006: Established TaeguTec Slovakia in Žilina
Apr. 2006: Established TaeguTec Malaysia in Kuala Lumpur
Jan. 2007: Established TaeguTec Thailand in Bangkok
Feb. 2007: Established TaeguTec Spain in Barcelona
Mar. 2007: Established TaeguTec France in Champs-sur-Marne
Jul. 2007: Established TaeguTec Indonesia in Bekasi
Nov. 2007: Established TaeguTec Poland in Wroclaw
Apr. 2008: Established TaeguTec Russia in Moscow
Apr. 2008: Established TaeguTec Ukraine in Dnipropetrovsk
Jun. 2009: Established TaeguTec South Africa in Johannesburg
Sep. 2009: Established TaeguTec Czech in Pilsen
Nov. 2009: Established TaeguTec Hungary in Törökbálint
Nov. 2010: Established TaeguTec Argentina in Buenos Aires
Apr. 2012: Opened TaeguTec Plant II

Awards and events
Received a "$100 million Export Tower" award (2005)
Warren Buffett visited TaeguTec (2007)
Received a "$200 million Export Tower" award (2008)
Warren Buffett attended TaeguTec Plant 2 inauguration ceremony (2011)

See also

Warren Buffett
Berkshire Hathaway
IMC
POSCO

References

External links
 Official website

South Korean brands
Companies based in Daegu
Manufacturing companies established in 1952
Companies of South Korea
Manufacturing companies of South Korea
Multinational companies
Berkshire Hathaway
1952 establishments in South Korea